A Fallen Idol is a lost 1919 American silent melodrama film starring Evelyn Nesbit, a famed former model and Broadway showgirl who had been at the center of two highly publicized court trials after her wealthy husband shot and killed a prominent architect in 1906 in front of hundreds of witnesses. The plot has some parallels with Nesbit's well-known life story, as do most of the films in which she appeared – exploiting her fame to attract audiences to her films. As in her life, the story centers around a beautiful woman pursued by two male rivals and a rape by a man of wealth and power. Other aspects of the story are quite different from those of her life. Nesbit plays a Hawaiian princess.

Plot
The plot centers around the Hawaiian Princess Laone (Nesbit), whose love for a man named Keith Parrish is thwarted by societal pressure from her benefactor Mrs. Parrish, who is his aunt. Princess Laone is despondent after being persuaded to refuse Keith Parrish's proposal, and she attempts suicide, but is rescued by Keith Parrish. After Parrish leaves town to take care of his father, Princess Laone is told he has abandoned her, and she departs for Hawaii on board the yacht of the dastardly wealthy playboy Stephen Brainard. Princess Laone is forced into having sex with Brainard by being threatened with gang rape by his crew. Keith Parrish is accused of stealing a sacred necklace, but Princess Laone is able to prove that he is innocent and that Brainard was smuggling the necklace. Brainard is arrested and the princess is able to marry Keith Parrish in the end.

Cast
 Evelyn Nesbit as Princess Laone
 Lillian Lawrence as Mrs. Parrish
 Sidney Mason as Keith Parrish
 Lyster Chambers as Stephen Brainard
 Pat J. Hartigan as Brainard's Chief Mate
 Harry Semels as Tushau
 Thelma Parker as Lato
 Marie Newton as Elsie Blair
 Fred C. Williams as Keith's Father

See also
 1937 Fox vault fire

References

External links

 

1919 films
American silent feature films
Fox Film films
Lost American films
1919 drama films
American black-and-white films
Films directed by Kenean Buel
Melodrama films
Silent American drama films
1919 lost films
Lost drama films
1910s American films